The Continental Blockade, or Continental System, was a large-scale embargo against British trade by Napoleon Bonaparte against the British Empire from 21 November 1806 until 11 April 1814, during the Napoleonic Wars.  Napoleon issued the Berlin Decree on 21 November 1806 in response to the naval blockade of the French coasts enacted by the British government on 16 May 1806. The embargo was applied intermittently, ending on 11 April 1814 after Napoleon's first abdication. 

Aside from subduing Britain, the blockade was also intended to establish French industrial and commercial hegemony in Europe. Within the French Empire, the newly acquired territories and client states were subordinate to France itself, as there was a unified market within France (no internal barriers or tariffs) while economic distortions were maintained on the borders of the new territories.

The Berlin Decree forbade the import of British goods into any European countries allied with or dependent upon France, and it installed the Continental System in Europe. All connections with Britain were to be cut, even the mail. However there was extensive smuggling, which made the Continental System an ineffective weapon of economic war. There was some damage to British trade, especially in 1808 and 1812, but British control of the oceans led to replacement trade with North and South America, as well as large scale smuggling in Europe particularly from Malta which was used by the British to sell their goods to southern Italy. 

The loss of Britain as a trading partner also hit the economies of France and its allies. Angry governments gained an incentive to ignore the Continental System, which led to the weakening of Napoleon's coalition. As Napoleon realized that extensive trade was going through Spain and Russia, he invaded those two countries. His forces were tied down in Spain, in which the Spanish War of Independence occurred simultaneously, and suffered severely in, and ultimately retreated from, Russia in 1812.

Background
The British government was the central force in encouraging and financing alliances against Napoleonic France. Napoleon was frustrated in his repeated attempts to defeat Britain. Attacks that involved naval power had all failed, with the systematic defeats of the combined French and Spanish navies. After the decisive defeat at Trafalgar, Napoleon made no attempt to rebuild his Navy. He turned instead to economic warfare, planning to ruin the British economy. It was thought that Britain depended completely upon trade with Europe for its prosperity, so cutting off trade with continental Europe would ruin the British economy and force it to sue for peace. A blockade was impossible because the Royal Navy controlled the seas, but if Napoleon controlled the ports of Europe, he could prevent British products from landing.

On 16 May 1806, the Royal Navy imposed a naval blockade of the French and French-allied coasts. In turn, Napoleon resorted to economic warfare. Britain was Europe's manufacturing and business center as a result of the Industrial Revolution. Napoleon believed it would be easy to take advantage of an embargo on trade with the European nations under his control, causing inflation and great debt to undermine the British strength. His position was strengthened by the Fall of Berlin in October 1806, bringing swathes of Prussia under his control.

In November 1806, having recently conquered or allied with every major power on the European continent, Napoleon, in retaliation to the British Order-in-Council of 17 May 1806 blockading all ports from Brest to the Elbe, issued the Berlin Decree forbidding his allies and conquests from trading with the British. Britain responded with further Orders in Council issued on 10 January and 11 November 1807. These forbade French trade with Britain, its allies or neutrals, and instructed the Royal Navy to blockade all French and allied ports, and to prevent all shipping whether neutral or not. Napoleon responded again with the Milan Decree of 1807, declaring that all neutral shipping using British ports or paying British tariffs were to be regarded as British and seized.

Napoleon's plan to defeat Britain was to destroy its ability to trade. As an island nation, trade was its most vital lifeline. Napoleon believed that if he could isolate Britain economically, he would be able to invade the nation after its economic collapse. Napoleon decreed that all commercial ships wishing to do business in Europe must first stop at a French port in order to ensure that there could be no trade with Britain. He also ordered all European nations and French allies to stop trading with Britain, and he threatened Russia with an invasion if they did not comply as well. His orders backfired in the Iberian Peninsula, especially in Portugal (being allied to Britain), setting off the Peninsular War. He pushed Russia too hard, both in terms of the Continental System, and in his demands for control over part of Poland. Napoleon's attempted 1812 invasion of Russia was a disaster which set the stage for his downfall.

Effects

British Empire
The System had mixed effects on British trade. The embargo encouraged British merchants to seek out new markets aggressively and to engage in smuggling with continental Europe. Napoleon's exclusively land-based customs enforcers could not stop British smugglers, especially as these operated with the connivance of Napoleon's chosen rulers of Spain, Westphalia, and other German states. British exports to the Continent fell between 25% to 55% compared to pre-1806 levels.  However, trade sharply increased with the rest of the world, covering much of the decline.

Britain, by Orders in Council, prohibited other countries (that is, its trade partners) from trading with France. The British countered the Continental system by threatening to sink any ship that did not come to a British port or chose to comply with France. This double threat created a difficult time for neutral nations like the United States. In response to this prohibition, the U.S. government adopted the Embargo Act of 1807 and eventually Macon's Bill No. 2. This embargo was designed as an economic counterattack to hurt Britain, but it proved even more damaging to American merchants. Together with the issues of the impressment of foreign seamen, and British support for Indian raids in the American west, tensions led to a declaration of war by the U.S. in the War of 1812. This war, not Napoleon's blockade, sharply reduced British trade with the United States. The blockade did not cause significant economic damage to the British, although British exports to the continent as a proportion of the country’s total trade dropped from 55% to 25% between 1802 and 1806.
On the other hand, the British economy suffered greatly from 1810 to 1812, especially in terms of high unemployment and inflation. This led to widespread protest and violence, but the middle classes and upper classes strongly supported the government, which used the army to suppress the working class unrest, especially the Luddite movement.

France and Continental Europe
The episode seriously hurt France itself. Shipbuilding, and its trades such as rope-making, declined, as did many other industries that relied on overseas markets, such as the linen industries. With few exports and lost profits, many industries were closed down. Southern France, especially the port cities of Marseille and Bordeaux, as well as the city of La Rochelle, suffered from the reduction in trade. Moreover, the prices of staple foods rose in most of continental Europe.

Napoleon's St. Cloud Decree in July 1810 opened the southwest of France and the Spanish frontier to limited British trade, and reopened French trade to the United States. It was an admission that his blockade had hurt his own economy more than the British. It had also failed to reduce British financial support for its allies. The industrialized north and east of France, and Wallonia (the south of today's Belgium) saw significantly increased profits due to the lack of competition from British goods (particularly textiles, which were produced much more cheaply in Britain).

In Italy, the agricultural sector flourished; but the Dutch economy, predicated on trade, suffered greatly as a result of the embargo. Napoleon's economic warfare was much to the chagrin of his own brother, King Louis I of Holland.

Scandinavia and the Baltic region
Britain's first response to the Continental system was to launch a major naval attack on the weakest link in Napoleon's coalition, Denmark. Although ostensibly neutral, Denmark was under heavy French and Russian pressure to pledge its fleet to Napoleon. London could not take the chance of ignoring the Danish threat. In the Second Battle of Copenhagen in August–September 1807, the Royal Navy bombarded Copenhagen, seized the Danish fleet, and assured control of the sea lanes in the North Sea and Baltic Sea for the British merchant fleet. The island of Heligoland off the west coast of Denmark was occupied in September 1807. This base made it easier for Britain to control trade to North Sea ports and to facilitate smuggling. The attacks against Copenhagen and Heligoland started the Gunboat War against Denmark, which lasted until 1814.

Sweden, Britain's ally in the Third Coalition, refused to comply with French demands and was attacked by Russia in February and by Denmark/Norway in March 1808. At the same time, a French force threatened to invade southern Sweden, but the plan was stopped as the Royal Navy controlled the Danish straits. The Royal Navy set up a base outside the port of Gothenburg in 1808 to simplify operations into the Baltic Sea. The Baltic campaign was under the command of admiral James Saumarez. In November 1810 France demanded that Sweden should declare war upon the United Kingdom and stop all trade. The result was a phony war between Sweden and Britain. A second navy base was set up on the island of Hanö in the south of Sweden in 1810. These two bases were used to support convoys from Britain to Gothenburg, then through the Danish straits to Hanö. From Hanö the goods were smuggled to the many ports around the Baltic Sea. To further support the convoys, the small Danish island of Anholt was occupied in May 1809. A lighthouse on the island simplified navigation through the Danish straits.

Russia also chafed under the embargo, and in 1810 reopened trade with Britain. Russia's withdrawal from the system was a motivating factor behind Napoleon's decision to invade Russia in 1812, which proved the turning point of the war and his regime.

Portugal and Spain
Portugal openly refused to join the Continental System. In 1793, Portugal signed a treaty of mutual assistance with Britain. After the Treaty of Tilsit of July 1807, Napoleon attempted to capture the Portuguese Fleet and the House of Braganza, and to occupy the Portuguese ports. He failed, as Queen Maria I of Portugal took her fleet and transferred the Portuguese court to Brazil with a Royal Navy escort. The Portuguese population rose in revolt against the French invaders, with the help of the British Army under Arthur Wellesley, later the Duke of Wellington. Napoleon intervened, and the Peninsular War began in 1808. Napoleon also forced the Spanish royal family to abdicate their throne in favor of Napoleon's brother, Joseph.

References

Further reading
 Aaslestad, Katherine B., and Johan Joor, eds. Revisiting Napoleon's Continental System: Local, Regional and European Experiences (Palgrave Macmillan, 2014). Wide-ranging essays by experts  excerpt
 Breunig, Charles. The Age of Revolution and Reaction 1789–1850 (1970), Chapter 2
 Broers, Michael. Europe Under Napoleon (IB Tauris, 2014).
 Crouzet, François. "Wars, blockade, and economic change in Europe, 1792–1815." Journal of Economic History 24#4 (1964): 567–88. in JSTOR
 Godechot, Jacques, et al. The Napoleonic era in Europe (1971) pp. 126–39, 156–59.
 Gottschalk, Louis R. The Era of the French Revolution. (1715–1815) (1929) pp. 373–99. online
 Heckscher, Eli. The continental system: an economic interpretation (1922), the only global survey of the Continental System; online
 Knight, Roger. Britain against Napoleon (2013) pp. 386–416.
 Mowat, R. B. The Diplomacy of Napoleon (1924) pp. 190–206 online
 O’Rourke, Kevin H. "War and welfare: Britain, France, and the United States 1807–14." Oxford Economic Papers 59.suppl 1 (2007): i8–i30, uses econometrics to argue Britain fared better than either France or the United States.
 Rose, J. H. "Napoleon and English Commerce." English Historical Review 8#32 (1893): 704–25. online.
 Ruppenthal, Roland. "Denmark and the Continental System." Journal of Modern History 15.1 (1943): 7–23. in JSTOR
 Sloane, William M."The Continental System of Napoleon" Political Science Quarterly (1898) 12#2 213–31.online

External links
 "Documents upon the Continental System", from napoleon-series.org

19th century in France
19th-century military history of the United Kingdom
Diplomacy
Economic nationalism
Economic warfare
War of 1812 legislation
Military history of France
Napoleon
Napoleonic Wars
Blockades involving the United Kingdom